The National Basketball League of Canada is a Canadian professional men's basketball league that began play in 2011. Each season, players are recognized for leading in each of the five major statistical categories: points, rebounds, assists, steals, and blocks.

Legend

Points
In basketball, points are the sum of the score accumulated through free throws or field goals. The National Basketball League of Canada scoring title is awarded to the player with the highest points per game average after the season. The Saint John Mill Rats have had two players lead the league, Kenny Jones and Anthony Anderson, a league-high. Two of the four players, Devin Sweetney and Anderson, led the league in scoring won the NBL Canada Most Valuable Player Award that same season.

Rebounds
In basketball, a rebound is the act of gaining possession of the ball after a missed field goal or free throw. An offensive rebound occurs when a player recovers the ball after their own or a teammate's missed shot attempt, while a defensive rebound occurs when a player recovers the ball after an opponent's missed shot attempt. The National Basketball League of Canada's (NBL) rebounding title is awarded to the player with the highest rebounds per game average. The London Lightning have had three players lead the league in rebounding: Gabe Freeman, Stephen Maxwell, and Marvin Phillips. Freeman finished with the highest rebounding average in NBL Canada history in 2012.

Assists
In basketball, an assist is a pass to a teammate that directly leads to a score by field goal. The National Basketball League of Canada's (NBL) assist title is awarded to the player with the highest assists per game average in a given season. Darren Duncan, who played with the Windsor Express for two seasons, leads the league with two such titles.

Steals
In basketball, a steal is a "defensive action" that causes the opponent to turn the ball over. The National Basketball League of Canada's (NBL) steal title is awarded to the player with the highest steals per game average in a given season. The most recent leader was Kevin Young of the Halifax Rainmen, who won the Defensive Player of the Year Award the same season.

Blocks
In basketball, a block (short for blocked shot) occurs when a defender deflects or stops a field goal attempt without committing a foul. The National Basketball League of Canada's (NBL) block title is awarded to the player with the highest blocks per game average in a given season. Cavell Johnson, who played with the Brampton A's for two seasons, leads the league with two blocks titles.

See also 
 List of National Basketball League of Canada career scoring leaders

Notes

References 

Lists of National Basketball League of Canada players